Apteropeoedes elegans is a species of grasshoppers. It is found in Madagascar.

References

External links 

 
 Apteropeoedes elegans at insectoid.info
 Apteropeoedes elegans at the Museum National d'Histoire Naturelle, Paris

Insects described in 1964
Euschmidtiidae